A battery electric multiple unit (BEMU), battery electric railcar or accumulator railcar is an electrically driven multiple unit or railcar whose energy is derived from rechargeable batteries driving the traction motors.

Prime advantages of these vehicles is that they do not use fossil fuels such as coal or diesel fuel, emit no exhaust gases and do not require the railway to have expensive infrastructure like electric ground rails or overhead catenary. Currently, battery electric units have a higher purchase price and running cost than petrol or diesel railcars. One or more charging stations are required along the routes they operate, unless operation is on a mixture of electrified and unelectrified track, with the batteries being charged from the electrified track.

Battery technology has greatly improved over the past 20 years broadening the scope of use of battery trains, moving away from limited niche applications. These sorts of ranges and battery recharging times greatly widens the scope of use of battery or battery-electric trains. Despite higher purchase, on certain railway lines battery trains are economically viable as the very high cost and maintenance of full line electrification is eliminated. Previously, incorporating lightly used unelectrified lines into an electrified network meant extending expensive electrical infrastructure, making many extensions unviable. Modern battery-electric trains have the ability to operate on both types of track. A number of metro networks around the world have extended electrified metro lines using battery-electric technology, with a number of networks considering the option.

From March 2014 passenger battery trains have been in operation in Japan on a number of lines. Austria has overhead wire/battery trains which became operational in 2019. Britain successfully trialled fare paying passenger hybrid overhead wire/lithium battery trains in January and February 2015.

History

Experiments with accumulator railcars, as they were originally called, were conducted from around 1890 in Belgium, France, Germany and Italy. Full implementation of battery trains were undertaken with various degrees of success. In the U.S., railcars of the Edison-Beach type, with nickel-iron batteries were used from 1911. The Drumm nickel-zinc battery was used on four 2-car sets between 1932 and 1946 on the Harcourt Street Line in Ireland. British Railways used lead-acid batteries in a British Rail BEMU from 1958 to 1966 on the 38 mile long Aberdeen to Ballater line in Scotland. The BEMU was a success, but decommissioned as the line was closed. A BEMU has been restored operating as a shunting train until proper battery charging facilities are built. In Germany between 1955 and 1995 Deutsche Bahn railways successfully operated 232 DB Class ETA 150 railcars utilising lead-acid batteries.

Supercapacitors

A number of tramway manufacturers are offering battery tramcars that combine the traction battery with a supercapacitor that will be charged at each stop. The main motivation for the usage of battery-powered tramways is to avoid railway electrification system installation. Using boost charging at each stop allows to lower the size of the required traction battery.  This technology is hoped to be transferred to full trains.

The CAF Urbos 3 tramways was ordered for the Seville MetroCentro with the Acumulador de Carga Rápida system which uses short overhead wires at each stop for charging. The Seville trams have been operating since Easter 2011.

Siemens three car trams are to be used for Education City in Doha, the capital of Qatar. The network opened in 2010. No overhead wires were installed, as the 10 Avenio trams will be powered by the Siemens Sitras HES system (Hybrid Energy Storage), a combination of a supercapacitor and a traction battery that are charged at each stop through an overhead conductor rail.

A Combino tramway using four car tramsets equipped with the Sitras HES system has been in regular service from Almada to Seixal, Portugal, since November 2008. It is capable of running up to distances of  without overhead wires.

A number of catenary-free tramways have opened in China that recharge at tram stops and terminals. The  Huai'an tram line in China, opened in February 2016. The line is entirely catenary-free utilising battery-powered trams supplied by CRRC Zhuzhou which recharge at tram stops.

By country

Australia

The Byron Bay Train service in Byron Bay, New South Wales operates a heritage 600 class railcar. The railcar was formerly diesel powered which was operational from 1949 to 1994. The railcar had the diesel equipment stripped out with electric traction motors fitted, being converted to solar power using a battery set to store solar generated energy from the cars' roof panels. The solar train came into operational use on a formerly disused section of line through Byron Bay in 2017. It is believed to be the world's first solar-powered train.

CAF Urbos 3 supercapacitor powered trams operate on the Newcastle Light Rail network with trams being recharged at each stop. The Canberra and Parramatta light rail networks are also planning to introduce battery powered CAF Urbos 3 vehicles on their networks. They will operate on battery power on select parts of their networks.

Austria
The Austrian Federal Railways has purchased 189 Siemens Desiro ML trains from 2013 to 2020. One of these trains was converted to a battery electric multiple unit and branded as cityjet eco. The trains are to be tested on regional and suburban rail lines on electrified and unelectrified track. The test services began in September 2019 on the Kamp Valley line between Horn and St. Pölten.

Cuba

In 1912 the  ordered a battery railcar by Thomas Edison and Ralph H. Beach.

Denmark

From the end of 2020, Stadler FLIRT Akku battery trains will be trialled on two lines, the  Helsingør to Hillerød line in North Zealand, and the  Lemvig line in northern West Jutland. If successful it is viewed the trains will be fully operational replacing the existing diesel trains in 2025.

France
In January 2021, Bombardier signed a new contract to retrofit and introduce a pre-series of five AGC battery-operated trains by 2023, in collaboration with SNCF and five French regions including Auvergne-Rhône-Alpes, Hauts-de-France, Nouvelle-Aquitaine, Occitanie and Provence-Alpes-Côte d'Azur. The 5 AGC trains will be modified into battery-operated to help decarbonise French rail transport. The idea is to convert dual-mode (catenary and diesel-powered) high capacity self-propelled trains to dual-mode battery-powered AGCs. This project offers a proof of concept and a way forward to eliminating diesel trains by 2035, a target set by the French government and SNCF.

Germany

In 1887 the first German accumulator railcars were placed in service by the Royal Bavarian State Railways.

DB Class ETA
Pre-Second World War classes ETA 177 to 180. The post-war DB Class ETA 176 (later 517) and finally ended with DB Class ETA 150 (later 515). The latter were used until 1995 having been since modernised into the Nokia ETA, painted light grey and green and deployed onto the so-called Nokia Railway (timetable number RB 46), nowadays the Glückauf-Bahn from Gelsenkirchen via Wanne-Eickel to Bochum.

Stadler Flirt Akku
In July 2019, Schleswig-Holstein rail authority NAH.SH awarded Stadler a €600m order for 55 battery-powered Flirt Akku multiple unit trains along with maintenance for 30 years. The trains, which offer  of battery range, will start entering service in 2022 replacing DMUs on non-electrified routes.

Siemens Mireo Plus B
The five routes of: Offenburg to Freudenstadt/Hornberg, Offenburg to Bad Griesbach, Offenburg to Achern, Achern to Ottenhöfen and Biberach (Baden) to Oberharmersbach-Riersbach will operate from December 2023 on electrified and unelectrified track, the 120 seat Seimens Mireo Plus B battery-powered/overhead power line trains.

Georgia

The New Athos Cave Railway in Abkhazia in the country of Georgia has three narrow-gauge power-concentrated battery electric multiple units built by the Railroad Machinery Plants of Riga in Latvia. Two Ep «Tourist» trains were built in 1975 and later modernized in 2005 and 2009, and the new Ep-563 train was built in 2014. Since 2014 this it been the only train in use. The first Ep train is based at Anakopea station for doubling the Ep 563 train in case of malfunction. Another Ep train is based at the depot. Each train consists of 6 cars, including 1 power car with driver's cab, motors and power equipment and 5 trailer cars for passengers (4 intermediate cars and 1 observation car in the end). Both models can run either on a third rail with 300 V DC or batteries with 240V DC being used for short unelectrified sections at switches without a third rail, and also at passenger stations where the third rail has no voltage for safety reasons.

Ireland
Between 1932 and 1949, two battery electric trains ran successfully between Dublin and Bray. Two additional trains were built and placed into service in 1939, also running until 1949. The train's batteries were charged at each terminus via an overhead pickup.

In 2019, Iarnród Éireann announced they would purchase 250 new carriages, with an option of up to 600, over a 10-year period, for use on the DART network. The order will consist of both electric multiple units and battery electric multiple units.

Japan

N700S bullet train 

The N700s train had battery backup introduced in June 2020. The batteries power the train at reduced speed to the nearest station when power outages occur. The train operates on the Tokaido Shinkansen line between Tokyo and Shin-Osaka, and the Sanyo Shinkansen line between Shin-Osaka and Hakata.

NE Train Smart Denchi-kun
In Japan, JR East tested a "NE Train Smart Denchi-kun" battery electric railcar from 2009. This vehicle is capable of operating under 1,500 V DC overhead wires or on battery power alone for a distance of up to 50 km away from an overhead power supply. The batteries are charged via the pantograph either when running under an overhead electric supply or at a specially built recharging facility.

EV-E301 series

Since March 4, 2017, battery electric trains have completely replaced diesel multiple units on this route. There are four two-car sets in operation, each set equipped with a 190 kWh lithium-ion battery.

The trains recharge their batteries at Karasuyama Station (the end of the line) via their pantographs, using a rigid conductor bar placed where the overhead wires would be, connected to the local electric grid. At the other end, at Hōshakuji, the Karasuyama Line meets the electrified Tohoku Main Line. The trains then continue over the electrified Tohoku Main Line to Utsunomiya, where passengers can change to Shinkansen high-speed trains.

BEC819 series

From April 2016, JR Kyushu started trial operation of a two-car BEC819 series BEMU train, nicknamed "DENCHA", on part of the Chikuhō Main Line, with revenue-earning service scheduled from October of the same year, and six more trains planned to be introduced on the line in spring 2017. It can also be powered via overhead AC power line. The BEC819 series battery-electric trains became operational on the through services on the Fukuhoku Yutaka Line in October 2016, which is electrified at 20 kV 60 Hz AC and the non-electrified Chikuhō Main Line, known as the "Wakamatsu Line", between Orio and Wakamatsu.

In 2019, a total of 11 new BEC819 trainsets were introduced on the Kashii Line, replacing all diesel multiple units previously operated on that line. This brought the total number of BEC819 trainsets in revenue service to 18.

EV-E801 series

It shares some characteristics with the BEC819 trains: it uses a 360 kWh battery and is recharged from a 20 kV 50 Hz AC overhead supply instead of a 1,500 V DC overhead supply used by the earlier EV-E301 trains.

Latvia
In 2022, the Road Transport Administration (ATD), which organizes passenger carrier services in Latvia, announced a procurement for the construction and delivery of 9 BEMU sets, with an option for 7 more, until the end of 2026. Stadler, CAF and Škoda Transportation had applied for BEMU deliveries in the first part of the tender. Seven of these trains will be used for the busiest unelectrified railway lines Rīga-Bolderāja and Rīga-Sigulda, with the other two being used on unelectrified routes such as Rīga-Dobele and Rīga-Jēkabpils. These trains will replace the currently-operating DR1A trains on these routes, while the operator remains to be decided by a future procurement.

United Kingdom

Historically, a number of battery electric trains have been used on British railways. The British Rail BEMU was taken out of service because the line from Aberdeen to Ballater in Scotland was closed in 1966. The trains have been renovated being ready for reuse on the Royal Deeside Railway.  The British Rail Class 419, motor luggage van, was operational from 1959 to 2004, which could run on either on batteries or a third rail, being used for short unelectrified section on quaysides.

The United Kingdom has almost two-thirds, 58%, of the  rail network on non-electrified track, which consumes 469 million litres of diesel each year. Mark Carne of Network Rail, who are responsible for the tracks of the British rail network, in March 2017 stated: "The idea that you need to electrify an entire route is no longer necessarily the case. I think that where we have got hybrid trains, that opens up quite a lot of interesting opportunities for partial electrification." Carne also stated: "technology was advancing at such a pace that better reliability could be achieved without the construction of unsightly overhead cables." He added that developments in batteries are such that it might soon be cost-effective to swap diesel engines for battery or hybrid devices, therefore saving the vast cost of installing power lines above every section of track.

Companies such as UK based Hitachi, Vivarail and Bombardier have committed to or are producing battery-electric trains. These trains will be either new units or conversion of existing units, to fulfil the aims of Network Rail's introduction of battery powered trains.

In 2015 a single Class 379 Electrostar, after electric lithium batteries were installed, began passenger operations on the Mayflower Line in Essex. The trial lasted one month from January to February. Network Rail refer to this prototype model and its possible future descendants as Independently Powered Electric Multiple Units (IPEMU).

The aim is to merge the line into the electric 3rd rail Merseyrail Wirral Line extending into the underground section of Liverpool's city centre, making Wrexham one of the branch terminals of the line. The line is diesel train operated unable to progress into the electric 3rd rail underground Birkenhead and Liverpool Merseyrail tunnels & stations. If battery trains are introduced that run into the tunnels, the Borderlands line will be incorporated into the Wirral Line becoming an urban metro line between Liverpool and Wrexham.

The diesel operated trains on the slow Borderlands line terminate at Bidston railway station in Birkenhead, with passengers having to change trains onto the Merseyrail electric network to proceed into Liverpool's centre. Network Rail proposed using dual battery powered/3rd rail pickup rolling stock without full electrification of the line, providing a cheaper method of incorporating the line in the Wirral Line. The trains will only terminate at Wrexham, while at the Liverpool end of the line trains will proceed around the loop of the electrified Liverpool city centre underground tunnels with thirteen station stops. As the train proceeds on the looped electrified line from Bidston and back, the train's batteries are charged.

Class 777

The Liverpool City Region Combined Authority announced in July 2021 that trials of a BEMU version their new Class 777 on the Merseyrail network had shown that they were capable of travelling up to  without a charge. The battery-electric version of the Class 777 would allow the possibility of Merseyrail services from Liverpool to Skelmersdale, Wrexham, Warrington and Runcorn, without full line electrification.

Class 230

Vivarail have produced the Class 230 train which is converted from redundant London Underground D-Stock trains. The second demonstrator unit, the two-car 230002, has been fitted for battery power in contrast to the diesel-electric power of the earlier 230001 demonstrator unit.  Vivarail have developed a fast charger giving a  range with a 10 minutes recharging time. Power is provided by two lithium-ion batteries per car giving four per train, providing , with an expected life of seven years for the batteries.

In 2017, Vivarail battery trains were being considered for use on the Valley Lines network in South Wales. The trains would be battery powered, capable of being recharged via 25 kV OHLE.

United States
The Edison-Beach battery railcar was developed by Thomas Edison and Ralph H. Beach. The latter headed the Railway Storage Battery Car Company and the Electric Car & Locomotive Corp. Car No. 105 of the Alaska Railroad was an Edison-Beach car, and examples operated on the Central Vermont Railway running between Millers Falls, Northfield and West Townshend. A notable feature of the Edison-Beach cars was the Beach drive system. Each wheel was mounted on ball bearings on a dead axle and was driven by an individual traction motor through gearing.

See also

 Battery locomotive
 Charging station
 Diesel multiple unit
 Electric multiple unit
 Electric vehicle battery
 Flywheel energy storage

References

Electric rail transport
Multiple units
Battery electric multiple units
Battery electric locomotives